De Jong is a Dutch language surname meaning "young". It is the most common surname in the Netherlands, represented by 86,534 people in 2017. It may also be found in the anglicized form Young or De Young.

Notable people with the surname are listed in the sections below.

Academics
Aise Johan de Jong (born 1966), Dutch mathematician
Arie de Jong (1865–1957), Dutch physician and linguist (Volapük)
Catherine de Jong (born 1956), Dutch anesthesiologist and drug rehab physician
Gerrit de Jong Jr. (1892-1978), Dutch-born Dean of Brigham Young University
Jan Willem de Jong (1921–2000), Dutch indologist
John H.A.L. de Jong (born 1947), Dutch linguist
Kenneth A De Jong, American computer scientist
Loe de Jong (1914–2005), Dutch historian and journalist
Mayke de Jong (born 1950), Dutch historian
Piet de Jong (born 1938), Dutch dendrologist
William DeJong (born 1950), American researcher in alcohol abuse

Arts
Ate de Jong (born 1953), Dutch film director
Bettie de Jong (born 1933), Dutch dancer
Boaz de Jong (born 1988), Dutch music producer and DJ known as "Boaz van de Beatz"
Constance DeJong (born 1950), American sculptor and painter
Eddie de Jong (born 1950), Dutch cartoonist
Erik de Jong (born 1961), Dutch singer-songwriter known as Spinvis
Esther De Jong (born 1974), Dutch model, artist and writer
Falco De Jong Luneau (born 1984), Austrian-Dutch singer-songwriter
Florence De Jong (1894-1990), English theatre and cinema organist
Folkert de Jong (born 1972), Dutch artist
Hans de Jong (1932–2011), Dutch sculptor, designer and ceramist.
Jacqueline de Jong (born 1939), Dutch painter and sculptor
Jill de Jong (born 1982), Dutch model and actress
Marinus De Jong (1891–1984), Dutch-born Belgian composer and pianist
Mark de Jong, Dutch Trance DJ
Matt de Jong, graphic designer and art director 
Maurice de Jong (born 1973), Dutch rock musician known as "Mories"
Michael De Jong (born 1945), Dutch–American blues guitarist and singer songwriter
Mijke de Jong (born 1959), Dutch film director
Paul de Jong, Dutch-American cellist
 Piet de Jong (1887-1967), English artist
Pieter de Jong (c.1610 – after 1639), Dutch guard portrayed by Frans Hals
Sam de Jong, New Zealand record producer
Tania de Jong, Dutch-born Australian soprano and entrepreneur
Sjoerd De Jong (born ca. 1984), Dutch level designer/game artist
Henry de Jong (born 2001) New Zealander lead drummer
Lewis de Jong (born 2003) New Zealander lead guitarist and vocals

Politics and religion
Bert de Jong (politician) (born 1945), Dutch politician
Cameron DeJong (born 1979), American (New Hampshire) politician
Dennis de Jong (born 1955), Dutch politician
Everard de Jong (born 1958), Dutch Roman Catholic auxiliary bishop
Frank de Jong (born 1955), Canadian politician and environmentalist
Harry de Jong (1932–2014), Canadian (British Columbia) politician
Jacob de Jong (c.1700-c.1764), Dutch Governor of Ceylon in 1752
Jacqueline de Jong (born 1939), Dutch activist
Johannes de Jong (1885–1955), Dutch Roman Catholic Cardinal
Léon de Jong (born 1982), Dutch politician
Mike de Jong (born 1963/64), Canadian politician
Piet de Jong (1915–2016), Prime Minister of the Netherlands 1967-1971
Simon De Jong (1942–2011), Dutch-born Canadian politician
Winny de Jong (born 1958), Dutch politician

Sports

Football
Aad de Jong (1921–2003), Dutch football defender
Andre de Jong (born 1996), New Zealand football forward
Boy de Jong (born 1994), Dutch football goalkeeper
Fred de Jong (born 1964), New Zealand football striker
Frenkie de Jong (born 1997), Dutch football midfielder
Henk de Jong (born 1964), Dutch football manager
Jason de Jong (born 1990), Filipino football midfielder
Jean-Paul de Jong (born 1970), Dutch football midfielder and manager
Jerry de Jong (born 1964), Dutch football defender
John de Jong (born 1977), Dutch football midfielder
Luuk de Jong (born 1990), Dutch football forward
Marcel De Jong (born 1986), Canadian soccer player
Nick de Jong (born 1989), Dutch football midfielder
Nigel de Jong (born 1984), Dutch football midfielder
Siem de Jong (born 1989), Dutch football midfielder
Theo de Jong (born 1947), Dutch football midfielder and coach
Tommy De Jong (born 1987), French football striker

Other sports
Antoinette de Jong (born 1995), Dutch speed skater
Arie de Jong (1882-1966), Dutch fencer
Barbara de Jong (born 1952), Dutch rower
Bert de Jong (born 1955), Dutch speed skater
Bert de Jong (1956-2013), Dutch rally driver
Bianca de Jong-Muhren (born 1986), Dutch chess grandmaster
Bob de Jong (born 1976), Dutch speed skater
Chase De Jong (born 1993), American baseball pitcher
Chris de Jong (born 1990), Dutch professional Counter-Strike player
Daniël de Jong (born 1992), Dutch racing driver
Demi de Jong (born 1995), Dutch cyclist
Dimi de Jong (born 1994), Dutch snowboarder
Doris de Jong (1902–1991), Dutch fencer
Haley de Jong (born 2001), Canadian artistic gymnast
Idske de Jong (born 1984), Dutch curler
Jan de Jong (1942-2009), icemaster of the Thialf skating stadium
Jannick de Jong (born 1987), Dutch motorcycle racer
Johanna de Jong (1895-1976), Dutch fencer
Jordan De Jong (born 1979), American baseball pitcher
Jos De Jong (born 1920), Belgian wrestler
Koos de Jong (1912-1993), Dutch sailor
Letitia de Jong (born 1993), Dutch speed skater
Linda de Jong, New Zealand rower
Marjolein de Jong (born 1968), Dutch volleyball player
Martijn de Jong (born 1974), Dutch mixed martial artist
Michael de Jong (born 1962), South African/American Rugby Player
Nick de Jong (sailor) (born 1942), Dutch sailor
Nicolas de Jong (born 1988), Dutch-French basketball player
Nicolaas de Jong (1887–1966), Dutch cyclist
Paul DeJong (born 1993), American baseball player
Petronella de Jong (born 1970), Dutch sailor
Rachelle de Jong (born 1979), Canadian rower
Reggie de Jong (born 1964), Dutch swimmer
Reuben de Jong, New Zealand kickboxer
Rita de Jong (born 1965), Dutch rower
Sidney de Jong (born 1979), Dutch baseball player
Thalita de Jong (born 1993), Dutch cyclist
Tonny de Jong (born 1974), Dutch speed skater
Worthy de Jong (born 1988), Dutch basketball player
Xenia Stad-de Jong (1922-2012), Dutch sprinter

Writers and journalists
Alex de Jong (born 1967), New Zealand journalist
Constance DeJong (born 1950), American librettist and playwright
Daphne de Jong (born 1939), pseudonym of New Zealand romance writer Clair de Jong
Dola de Jong (1911–2003), Dutch-American writer
Meindert De Jong (1906–1991), Dutch-born American author
Oek de Jong (born 1952), Dutch novelist

As part of a compound surname
Robin Huisman de Jong (born 1988), Dutch footballer
J.P.B. de Josselin de Jong (1886–1964), Dutch anthropologist
P.E. de Josselin de Jong (1922–1999), Dutch anthropologist
Pieter de Josselin de Jong (1861–1906), Dutch painter
Johanna Stokhuyzen-de Jong (1895–1976), Dutch fencer
Theodoor Johan Arnold van Zijll de Jong (1836–1917), Dutch military leader

See also
76272 De Jong, an asteroid
De Jonge
De Jongh
Jong (disambiguation)

References

Dutch-language surnames
Surnames from nicknames